With the Old Breed: At Peleliu and Okinawa is a World War II memoir by United States Marine Eugene Sledge, first published in 1981. The memoir is based on notes Sledge kept tucked away in a pocket-sized Bible he carried with him during battles he fought at Peleliu and Okinawa. The book formed part of the basis of the material covered by Ken Burns' PBS documentary The War (2007), as well as the HBO miniseries The Pacific (2010), in which Sledge was portrayed by Joseph Mazzello.

Origins
By his own account, Sledge began writing the memoir in 1944, "immediately after Peleliu while we were in rest camp on Pavuvu Island" and continued working on it "as soon as I returned to civilian life" in 1946. Nicknamed "Sledgehammer" by his comrades, Sledge experienced combat during the battles of Peleliu and Okinawa as a 60 mm mortarman while part of K Company, 3rd Battalion, 5th Marines, 1st Marine Division (K/3/5).

The book's working title was A Marine Mortarman in World War II, which Sledge later changed to Into The Abyss. The book was first published under its final title by the Presidio Press in 1981.

Synopsis
Sledge's memoir gives a firsthand perspective on the Pacific Theatre. His memoir is a front-line account of infantry combat in the Pacific War. It brings the reader into the island hopping, the jungle heat and rain, the filth and malaise, the fear of potential banzai attacks, and the hopelessness and loss of humanity that characterized the campaign in the Pacific. Sledge wrote starkly of the brutality displayed by Japanese soldiers during the battles and of the hatred that both sides harbored for each other. In Sledge's words, "This was a brutish, primitive hatred, as characteristic of the horror of war in the Pacific as the palm trees and the islands."

Sledge describes one instance in which he and a comrade came across the mutilated bodies of three Marines, butchered and with their severed genitals inserted into their mouths. He also describes the behavior of some Marines towards dead Japanese, including the removal of gold teeth from Japanese corpses (including, in one case, from a severely wounded but still living Japanese soldier), as well as other macabre trophy-taking. He details the process and mechanisms that slowly strip away a combat infantryman's humanity and compassion, in a manner accessible for a general audience.

Sledge describes in detail the physical struggle of living in a combat zone and the debilitating effects of constant fear, fatigue, and filth. "Fear and filth went hand-in-hand," he wrote. "It has always puzzled me that this important factor in our daily lives has received so little attention from historians and is often omitted from otherwise excellent personal memoirs by infantrymen." Marines had trouble staying dry, finding time to eat their rations, practicing basic field sanitation (it was impossible to dig latrines or catholes in the coral rock on Peleliu), and simply moving around on the pulverized coral of Peleliu and in the mud of Okinawa.

Reception

Describing it as an example of "the American procedure at its best, unashamed of simplicity," Paul Fussell said that With the Old Breed "is one of the finest memoirs to emerge from any war."

New York Times writer and editor Dwight Garner describes the book's depiction of war as "surpassingly vivid", adding, "What puts 'With the Old Breed''' across is, oddly enough, Sledge's sensitivity. He offers many small, artful portraits of men he admires. (And a few he despises.) He chronicles small kindnesses and profound acts of friendship."

Printings
 1981: Novato, California: Presidio Press. — 
 1983: Paperback: Toronto; New York: Bantam Books. —  — 
(The Bantam war book series)
 1990: New York, New York: Oxford University Press. —  — 
(New introduction by Paul Fussell)
 1990: Novato, California: Presidio. —  — 
 1996: Annapolis, Maryland: Naval Institute Press. —  — 
(Classics of Naval Literature series; introduction by Joseph H. Alexander)
 2001: Prince Frederick, Maryland: Recorded Books. —  — 
(Audio-10 cassettes)
 2006: Princeton, New Jersey: Recording for the Blind & Dyslexic. — 
(Audio-CD)
 2007: New York, New York: Presidio Press:
(New introduction by Victor Davis Hanson)
Trade paperback — (8.2" x 5.5"):  — 
Mass market paperback — (6.8" x 4.2"):  — 
 2010: London, England: Ebury Press
Trade paperback  - 

Translation into Japanese
 2008:
title 
size of 14.8 x 11 x 2 cm
 

Translation into Thai
 2010 แปซิฟิก สมรภูมิเดนตาย สหายร่วมรบ by Matichon press

 

Translation into Czech
 Se starou gardou: na Peleliu an Okinawě, Universum [translation Michal Ulvr]
 

Translation into German
 2013 Vom alten Schlag: Der Zweite Weltkrieg am anderen Ende der Welt. Erinnerungen, riva Verlag
 

Translation into French
 2019 Frères d'armes, Les Belles Lettres [translation Pascale Haas]
 

Adaptations
 2007: Ken Burns drew considerably from With the Old Breed for his World War II documentary The War.
 2010: HBO used With the Old Breed, along with Robert Leckie's Helmet for My Pillow, as the basis for the miniseries The Pacific, the successor to Band of Brothers'', during which Sledge (played by Joseph Mazzello) is seen occasionally writing notes in his pocket bible.

References

External links
  at the Internet Archive
 
 
 
  6-part Interview, ca. 1979-1983

1981 non-fiction books
Alabama culture
Memoirs adapted into films
World War II memoirs
Non-fiction books about the United States Marine Corps
American memoirs
Non-fiction books adapted into television shows